Lina Larissa Strahl (born 15 December 1997) is a German singer-songwriter and actress. She is known for her roles as Bibi Blocksberg in the Bibi & Tina film series and Frankie in Disney Channel musical drama, The Lodge.

Early life 
Strahl was born in 1997. She was born and raised in Seelze, in the district of Hanover. She lives in Hamburg.

Career 
In 2013, Strahl won Dein Song (Your Song), a music competition on the children's channel KiKa, after performing Freakin’ Out in the final, a song which was composed along with the group MIA. She released a single, Wie ich bin, in March 2016. Her first album, Official, was released later that year.

Strahl is also known for having played the role of Bibi Blocksberg in four Bibi & Tina films. In 2017, she appeared in The Lodge, playing a music student called Frankie. Later that year, Strahl released her second studio album, Ego. This became her first top 5 album in Germany. On 9 November 2018, Strahl released her third album, titled R3bellin. The album reached number 1 on the German charts.

Personal life 
She is in a relationship with the German actor Tilman Pörzgen.

Filmography

Discography

Studio albums

Soundtracks

Singles

Other charted songs

References

External links 

1997 births
German actresses
German women singer-songwriters
Living people
21st-century German women singers
People from Hanover Region